Jowulu, also known as Jɔ or ambiguously as Samogho, is a minor Mande language of Mali and Burkina Faso.

References

Mande languages
Languages of Mali